Small Wonder is an American children's comedy science fiction sitcom that aired in first-run syndication from September 7, 1985, to May 20, 1989. The show chronicles the family of a robotics engineer who secretly creates a robot modeled after a human girl, then tries to pass it off as their adopted daughter, Vicki. The series turned out to be a surprise hit, specifically amongst the kid section, as many channels belonging to different nations witnessed while re-running the show. Owing to its popularity in some countries, the show had to be dubbed for different languages.

Premise 
The story lines revolve around V.I.C.I. (an acronym for Voice Input Child Identicant, pronounced "Vicki"), an android in the form of a 10-year-old girl. Vicki was built by Ted Lawson, an engineer/inventor for United Robotronics, in an effort to assist handicapped children. Lawson takes the robot home so that it can mature within a family environment. Vicki's features include superhuman strength and speed, an AC outlet under her right arm, a data port under her left arm, and an access panel in her back. Despite this, the Lawson family initially tries to pass Vicki off as an orphaned family member whom they legally adopt as their daughter.

The Lawson family tries to keep the robot's existence a secret, but their disagreeable neighbors, the Brindles, keep on popping up at the most unexpected moments — especially nosy next-door neighbor Harriet, whose father happens to be Ted Lawson's co-worker. The show's humor frequently derived from Vicki's attempts to learn human behavior, her unprecedented echolalia, the robot's literal interpretation of speech and the family's efforts to disguise the robot's true nature.

To explain child actress Tiffany Brissette's aging during the show, the series' producers had Ted give Vicki an upgrade in the series' third season. He aged her face, dressed her in modern clothes, and allowed her to eat and drink. The food passed through her naturally and the drink cooled her internal system.

Cast & characters 

 Dick Christie as Ted Lawson - Jamie's father, Joan's husband and Vicki's creator. A robotics engineer who originally created the Vicki robot as a domestic servant with a female child's appearance.
 Marla Pennington as Joan Anderson Lawson - Ted's wife and Jamie's mother. Joan, more than anyone else on the show, regards Vicki as a real person.
 Jerry Supiran as Jamie Lawson - The 10-year-old son of Ted and Joan.
 Emily Schulman as Harriet Brindle - The nosy neighbors' daughter who has a crush on Jamie.
  Tiffany Brissette as Victoria "Vicki" Ann Smith-Lawson - A robot modeled after a real human girl. The robot was a Voice Input Child Identicant (V.I.C.I.), but was nicknamed Vicki. She has realistic hair and skin. She possesses superhuman strength and speed and runs on atomic power. Vicki has an access panel in her back, an electrical outlet in her right armpit, and an RS-232 serial port under her left armpit. Vicki's artificial intelligence is not perfect; she is incapable of emotion, speaks in a monotone voice and interprets most commands literally. She does manage to blend into the real world to a point. Vicki attends school, and no one but her family members and a few trusted friends know her secret. Occasionally, Vicki had rare abilities that seemed to only appear in one or two episodes, such as elongating her neck to reach a door's peephole, shrinking her size to become as small as a doll or making herself ten feet tall to get noticed by everyone. Somehow, she could also channel enough electricity through her hands to jump-start a car (or with more control, serve as a defibrillator to save the life of a person suffering a heart attack). One recurring theme was that Vicki had a super-powered learning system which enabled her to improve something such as a new detergent or to greatly increase the gas mileage of cars, which Jamie often saw as a chance to get rich quick, only to find her improvements were not perfect. Vicki lives in a cabinet in Jamie's bedroom, and becomes more human-like over the course of the show.

Recurring 
 William Bogert as Brandon Brindle - Harriet's father. Becomes Ted Lawson's boss after stealing Ted's ideas. Also a neighbor to the Lawsons.
  Edie McClurg as Bonnie Brindle- Harriet's mother and Brandon's wife. Written out after the second season after McClurg joined the cast of The Hogan Family, though Bonnie appears one more time in a third-season episode.
  Alice Ghostley as Ida Mae Brindle -Brandon's outspoken, know-it-all sister who is nearly identical to his wife Bonnie.
  Paul C. Scott as Reggie Williams - Jamie's best friend and sometimes rival.
 Lihann Jones as Jessica - Jamie's sometime girlfriend.
 Daryl Bartley as Warren Enright - Jamie's sometime school friend.
 Tiffany Brissette as Vanessa - Evil robot who looks identical to Vicki, but does not speak in a monotone (seasons 3–4).

Reruns and international airings 
After the series ended, the show entered weekday rerun syndication on many stations across the United States and continued until 1996. After that, the show had not aired anywhere in the country until January 10, 2015, when Antenna TV began airing the series on weekends, which continued until May 27, 2017. The network resumed airing the show on September 9, 2017. It was dropped again after March 31, 2019.

In Europe, the show was screened regionally in the United Kingdom on ITV from October 1985 until late 1988. Only the first two series were shown. Sky One also broadcast the series in full from 1988 to the early 1990s. In Italy, the show appeared in the mid-1980s on Italia 1 network and was titled Super Vicky. In France, the series was shown as La Petite merveille (The Little Wonder) on Canal+, starting in November 1985. In Spain, the show was broadcast on Antena 3 Televisión as Un robot en casa (A Robot at Home) in December 1995. In Germany the show was broadcast on ProSieben in 1990 (with several reruns in the early 1990s) and was titled Vicki.

It was aired on many TV stations in Middle East as well, such as Saudi TV Channel 2 and Iraq TV Channel 1, with Arabic subtitles and called الاعجوبة الصغيرة. In Saudi Arabia, it was aired during the '80s as a daily family show during the month of Ramadan on Saudi TV (Channel 2).

In India, Pakistan, China, and other Asian countries, Small Wonder was syndicated on local TV stations and the Star TV Network in the mid-1990s. In 1994, it was aired in India on Star Plus first in English then in Hindi the same year most of the time, until 1998 and in Tamil in Star Vijay in the beginning of the 2000s. It aired in Pakistan on Network Television Marketing. In 1986, it aired in Thailand on Channel 9 at 9:00 p.m. after the evening news. In the Philippines, it aired on GMA Network in the mid-1980s, and on ABC in 1992. In Indonesia, it was aired on TVRI. TVNZ screened the show in New Zealand in a weekday afternoon slot the mid-1980s.

In Latin America, the show appeared on Rede Globo and, later, TV Record in Brazil and was called Super Vicky. It also aired on VTV (Venezolana de Televisión) in Venezuela between 1987 and 1990, Canal 13 in Argentina, Bogotá local network Canal Capital in Colombia, Teleantillas in the Dominican Republic and Frecuencia Latina in Peru, where it was called La pequeña maravilla (Small Wonder).

Reception 
Despite proving popular among viewers, it has been regarded by some critics as one of the worst sitcoms of all time, such as Robert Bianco, TV critic for USA Today, who listed it as a contender for one of the worst TV shows of all time in 2002. According to the BBC, it "is widely considered one of the worst low-budget sitcoms of all time."

Awards

Episodes

Home media
Shout! Factory has released the first two seasons of Small Wonder on DVD in Region 1.

See also
 My Living Doll. Howard Leeds, producer of Small Wonder, also produced this 1964–1965 sitcom starring Bob Cummings and Julie Newmar with the same premise as Small Wonder (except the gynoid is an adult female and the lead male character takes custody of the robot as opposed to building her).
 Not Quite Human, a series of novels in which a scientist creates an android, passing him off as his son, telling only his daughter the truth. The series was made into several TV movies for the Disney Channel.
 Karishma Kaa Karishma, the Indian television sitcom remake. The series aired on STAR Plus.
 Dr. Slump, where a crazy Japanese inventor makes an android daughter so he can become closer to a local teacher he is in love with.
 A.I. Artificial Intelligence – also known as A.I., is a 2001 American science fiction film written, directed, and produced by Steven Spielberg, and based on Brian Aldiss's short story "Super-Toys Last All Summer Long". The film stars Haley Joel Osment, Jude Law, Sam Robards, Frances O'Connor, Brendan Gleeson, and William Hurt. Set sometime in the future, A.I. tells the story of David, a childlike android uniquely programmed with the ability to love.

 Bahu Hamari Rajni Kant — The Indian television series in which a scientist named Shaan Kant creates an android for his boss and names it RAJNI (Randomly Accessible Job Networking Interface), who becomes his wife Rajni-Kant and makes a good impression on his family. The truth about her is known only to Shaan and his friend Dev.
 Yo Soy Franky and I Am Frankie - The Colombian children's telenovela and American re-make has a teenage android named Frankie Gaines created by a robot scientist who wants to see how she does in high school, and has to keep it a secret from the general student body. Other androids are developed by rivals who also appear at the school.
 D.A.R.Y.L. - 1985 American science fiction film about a government-created "Data-Analyzing Robot Youth Lifeform".

References

External links
 
 

1980s American comic science fiction television series
1980s American sitcoms
1985 American television series debuts
1989 American television series endings
Androids in television
English-language television shows
First-run syndicated television programs in the United States
Television series about families
Television series about robots
Television series by 20th Century Fox Television
Television series by Metromedia